Navakoti Narayana is a 1964 Indian Kannada-language film directed by S. K. Ananthachari starring Rajkumar and Sowcar Janaki. The film is based on the life of Purandara Dasa, a prominent composer of Carnatic music who lived from 1484 to 1564. In the film, Rajkumar plays the role of Purandara Dasa. The music of the film was composed by Shivaprasad. This was the second Kannada movie on the life of Purandara Dasa after 1937 movie Purandaradasa.

Cast
 Rajkumar as Purandara Dasa
 Sowcar Janaki as Saraswati, wife of Purandara Dasa
 Dikki Madhava Rao
 H.R. Shastri as Vyasatirtha
 Mala
 Radhika
 Kemparaj

Soundtrack

The music of the film was composed by Shivaprasad.

Tracklist

References

External links
 

1964 films
1960s Kannada-language films
Hindu devotional films